Tragedy of Love (German: Tragödie der Liebe) is a 1923 German silent film directed by Joe May and starring Mia May, Emil Jannings and Marlene Dietrich.

The film's sets were designed by the art directors Erich Kettelhut, Paul Leni and Erich Zander.

Cast
In alphabetical order

See also
The Countess of Paris (1923)

References

External links

Films of the Weimar Republic
German silent feature films
Films directed by Joe May
Films set in Paris
German black-and-white films
UFA GmbH films